Antonio Vera Ramírez (born 2 July 1934, in Barcelona), a Spanish author who wrote about factual scientific subjects, but in various fictional styles, such as mystery, crime and romance, well-known as Lou Carrigan, he also wrote under the pseudonyms Angelo Antonioni, Crowley Farber, Lou Flanagan, Anthony Hamilton, Sol Harrison, Anthony Michaels, Anthony W. Rawer, Angela Windsor and Giselle.

Vera Ramírez married Pepita Rodero Forga in 1958 and started to write. He used pulp fiction and Anglicized words in his books, such as Moderno diccionario ilustrado de la lengua castellana, Adios, good-bye, sayonara, Poderes Ocultos de Los Seres Superiores and Jardín siniestro He wrote over 25  books, and also worked with Adriano Bolzoni to complete "No importa morir" in 1969.

Filmography
 Four Candles for Garringo (1971)
 And the Crows Will Dig Your Grave (1971)
 Stagecoach of the Condemned (1970)
 Twenty Paces to Death (1970)
 La banda de los tres crisantemos (1970)
 Bridge Over the Elbe (1969)
 Estudio 3 (1965)

Bibliography

As Antonio Vera Ramírez

Non-fiction 
¿Qué es el Opus Dei? (1993)
Pregúntale a Lao Tse (1997)
Pregúntale a Mahoma (1997)
Pregúntale a Confucio (1998)

References

External links 
 
 

1934 births
Spanish male writers
Living people